Răzvan Dorin Șelariu  (born 2 November 1983 in Reșița) is a Romanian artistic gymnast. He is a bronze Olympic medalist and a multiple European medalist. Răzvan is an all around   gymnast; he is a silver all  European medalist on this event.

Awards
Șelariu was voted the Romanian Gymnastics Federation's Athlete of the Year 2008. He shared the title with Sandra Izbaşa.

References

External links
 
 
 
 

1983 births
Living people
Sportspeople from Reșița
Romanian male artistic gymnasts
Gymnasts at the 2004 Summer Olympics
Gymnasts at the 2008 Summer Olympics
Olympic gymnasts of Romania
Olympic bronze medalists for Romania
European champions in gymnastics
Olympic medalists in gymnastics
Medalists at the 2004 Summer Olympics